Our Day Will Come is a French 2010 drama film co-written and directed by Romain Gavras. It stars Vincent Cassel, who is also one of the producers.

Plot
Rémy (Barthélémy) is a red-headed teenage outcast living in north-western France. He meets the troubled psychiatrist Patrick (Cassel) and together they set off on a voyage with no predetermined destination in their newly acquired red Porsche. They decide to go to Ireland on the assumption that redheads are well treated there.

Cast
Vincent Cassel as Patrick
 as Rémy
Justine Lerooy as Natacha
Vanessa Decat as Vaness
Boris Gamthety as Serge (as Boris Gamthety 'Byron')
Rodolphe Blanchet as Joel
Chloe Catoen as redhead (as a child)
Sylvain Le Mynez as hostage
Pierre Boulanger as receptionist
Julie Vergult as Lea
Mathilde Braure as Rémy's mother
Camille Rowe as the English girl #1
Joséphine de La Baume as the English girl #2
Alexandra Dahlström as the English girl #3

Reception
On the review aggregate website Rotten Tomatoes, the film has an approval rating of 45%, based on 11 reviews with an average score of 5.79/10. Peter Bradshaw of The Guardian gave it 2/5 and called it "a road movie that runs out of road – and out of ideas."

See also
Notre Jour Viendra OST

References

External links

2010 films
2010s French-language films
French drama films
2010 drama films
Films shot in France
2010 directorial debut films
2010s French films